Mikhaylovsk is a town and the administrative center of Shpakovsky District in Stavropol Krai, Russia, located along the Tashla River,  northeast of Stavropol, the administrative center of the krai. Population:  During the period  2010-2021, Mikhaylovsk's population grew to 114,133, achieving the fastest population growth rate of all regional cities in Russia.

History
It was founded in 1784 as the village of Mikhaylovskoye and later became a Cossack stanitsa. In 1870, it lost its military significance and was demoted back to rural status. In 1963, it was renamed Shpakovskoye. It was granted town status and given its present name in 1999.

Administrative and municipal status
Within the framework of administrative divisions, Mikhaylovsk serves as the administrative center of Shpakovsky District. As an administrative division, it is, together with three rural localities, incorporated within Shpakovsky District as the Town of Mikhaylovsk. As a municipal division, the Town of Mikhaylovsk is incorporated within Shpakovsky Municipal District as Mikhaylovsk Urban Settlement.

Economy
The following industrial enterprises operate in the town:
Combine of building materials
Auto parts factory
Poultry factory
Breeder
Brickyard

Transportation

Pelagiada railway station is located within the town; with directions to Elista, Stavropol, and Kavkazskaya railway station.

Demographics
Russians: 50,626 persons (87.1%)
Armenians: 4,454 persons (7.7%)
Romani: 747 persons (1.3%)
Ukrainians: 737 persons (1.3%)

References

Notes

Sources

Cities and towns in Stavropol Krai
Populated places established in 1784